Asarta alticola is a species of snout moth in the genus Asarta. It was described by George Hampson in 1930 and is known from India.

References

Moths described in 1930
Phycitini
Moths of Asia